Chahak (also Romanized as Chāhak) is a village in Eslamabad Rural District, in the Central District of Jiroft County, Kerman Province, Iran. At the 2006 census, its population was 44, in 13 families.

References 

Populated places in Jiroft County